Marian Dora (born 1970 in Southern Germany) is the pseudonym most commonly used by an anonymous German art director, cinematographer, actor, screenwriter, editor, producer, composer, assistant director, makeup artist, special effects/sound/camera/electricity technician, and set decorator/designer, anagram of his actual name, occasionally also credited under several other pseudonyms including Marian Dora Bolutino, Marian Dora Botulino, Marian D. Bolutino, M.D. Botulino, Dr. M. Duran,Marian D. Botulino, M. Duran, Art Doran, M.D. Bolutino, A. Doran, Marian Bolutino and Marian Dallamano.

Biography
Marian Dora's first appearance in the film scene dates back to the early 90s, when he started making short films as member of a group of anonymous underground filmmakers. Some of these short films were featured on two anthologies, Blue Snuff 1 and Blue Snuff 2 (the latter withdrawn due to its extreme content). These anthologies would later be released in the form of various standalone short films.

Dora then started working as film producer, editor, and second unit director on several films by Ulli Lommel, whom he had met and started a long-time partnership with in 1996, including Zombie Nation (2004), Green River Killer (2005), B.T.K. Killer (2005), Killer Pickton (2006), and Absolute Evil (2009).

Although Dora had already shot his first feature-film, Debris Documentar, in 2003, his debut as director was marked in 2006 by Cannibal, a reconstruction of the case of Armin Meiwes, who killed and ate a willing victim whom he met on the internet. The film was originally an assignment from Ulli Lommel, but Dora had to release it by himself after its rejection by Lommel because of its extremely gory nature. Cannibal achieved resounding success in the underground film panorama, allowing Dora to start the shooting of his next work in the same year.

Melancholie der Engel, Dora’s third film, premiered on 1 May 2009 at  festival in Berlin and won the “Best Arthouse Feature Film” prize at New York International Independent Film and Video Festival. According to Dora, the shooting of the film was a nightmarish experience full of madness, violence, and drug abuse by actor Zenza Raggi. Melancholie der Engel generated a lot of controversy because of many scenes involving rape, coprophilia, zoophilia, and real animal cruelty (though the murder of a cat was proved to be fake). The controversy surrounding Melancholie der Engel resulted in several death threats to Dora and the end of his partnership with Frank.

Reise nach Agatis, Dora’s fourth work, was released in 2010. A DVD version of the film featured Debris documentar as bonus disc, marking its first release nine years after the shooting. In 2012 Dora was confirmed to be the director of Mors in Tabula, one of twelve segments developed for the anthology The Profane Exhibit.

In 2014 Dora released his fifth film, Carcinoma, under the name of Art Doran. The film won an award at the 2015 Sadique-Master Festival, held in Paris. In 2017 Dora appeared in a documentary called Revisiting Melancholie der Engel, walking Swedish filmmaker Magnus Blomdahl through the film’s locations and talking about the making of the film.

Influences
Dora’s main influence is the European cinema of the 70s: he is a great admirer of the work of Italian directors Gualtiero Jacopetti, Ruggero Deodato, and Sergio Martino, as well as of composers Riz Ortolani, Pippo Caruso, Ennio Morricone, and Guido & Maurizio De Angelis. His favorite film is 1978’s The Green Room by François Truffaut, which he quoted in his film Carcinoma, along with Epicurus’s Letter to Menoeceus and the famous 19th-century German song  – the latter also being used as foundation for a major part of the film’s score.

Europe’s literary and poetical tradition is another major influence on Dora: many dialogues in his films contain references to the works of Johann Wolfgang von Goethe, Eduard Mörike, Georg Büchner, Marquis de Sade, Friedrich Nietzsche, and many others. Dora has claimed that he is fascinated by serial killers like Charles Manson, Andreas Baader, Jeffrey Dahmer, and Dennis Nilsen, particularly their ability to manipulate other people in order to get what they want.

Filmography

Feature films
Cannibal (2006)
Melancholie der Engel (2009)
Reise nach Agatis (2010)
Debris documentar (2012)
The Profane Exhibit ("Mors in Tabula" segment) (2013)
Carcinoma (2014)
Pesthauch der Menschlichkeit (2018)
Der Verlangen der Maria D. (2018)
Thomas und Marco (2022)

Short films
Agonie
An einem Morgen im Frühling
Cadavericon
Caribbean Sunrise
Carnophage
Christian B.
Der Puppenschänder 1 
Der Puppenschänder 2
Die Toten von San Angelo
Erotic Fantasy
Es geschah in Gotha
Journey Into Perversion
Opus hominis 1
Opus hominis 2
Polydipsia
Proud Off
Provokation 1
Provokation 2
Sad Impression
Sane Impression 1 
Sane Impression 2
Science
Sommerliebelei
Subcimitero 1
Subcimitero 2: Guanajuato
The Devil’s Possessed – Behind the Scenes of Jess Franco’s 
The Devil’s Torturer
Vita minima

References

External links

Marian Dora at Hollywood.com
Marian Dora at filmportal.de 
Marian Dora at AlloCiné 

1970 births
21st-century German composers
21st-century German artists
21st-century German physicians
21st-century German writers
21st-century German male writers
Anonymous artists
German film producers
German experimental filmmakers
German film score composers
German make-up artists
German male artists
German male composers
German male non-fiction writers
German medical writers
German production designers
German set decorators
Male film score composers
Outsider artists
Outsider musicians
Pseudonymous artists
Silent film directors
Silent film producers
Special effects people
Visual effects artists
Living people
21st-century German male musicians
21st-century pseudonymous writers